Tracklisten is a chart that ranks the best-performing singles and tracks of the Denmark. Its data, published by IFPI Denmark and compiled by Nielsen Music Control, is based collectively on each single's weekly digital sales.

Chart history

See also
List of number-one albums from the 2010s (Denmark)
2013 in music

References

Number-one hits
Denmark
2013